Justin Erenkrantz was President of the Apache Software Foundation. He previously served as Treasurer for the ASF. Erenkrantz worked as a software engineer for Joost. He is currently working as Head of Compute Architecture at Bloomberg L.P., New York. Erenkrantz has made major coding developments on Apache HTTP Server, APR, mod_mbox, flood and Serf.  As of 2010 Erenkrantz graduated from the University of California, Irvine where he received a PhD. His dissertation is titled Computational REST: A New Model for Decentralized, Internet-Scale Applications.

References

Living people
Year of birth missing (living people)